Tara Teigen (born 28 June 1975) is a Canadian snowboarder. She competed in the women's halfpipe event at the 1998 Winter Olympics.

References

1975 births
Living people
Canadian female snowboarders
Olympic snowboarders of Canada
Snowboarders at the 1998 Winter Olympics
Sportspeople from Calgary